 

The Yangsigang Yangtze River Bridge is a suspension bridge in Wuhan, Hubei, China. It opened to traffic on October 8, 2019 and is the third longest suspension bridge span in the world and overall the longest in China. The bridge is the longest double-deck bridge span in the world and carries motorized vehicles, non-motorized vehicles, and pedestrians on its two decks. The bridge cost CNY ¥8.5 billion (US$1.27 billion) to build.

The bridge connects the Hanyang and Wuchang districts. The lower deck includes four more motor vehicle lanes that connect to the city streets, two  lanes for non-motorized vehicles, and two more pedestrian walkways.

See also
 List of bridges in China
 Bridges and tunnels across the Yangtze River
 List of longest suspension bridge spans

Notes

References

External links

Bridges over the Yangtze River
Suspension bridges in China
Road bridges in China
Bridges in Wuhan
Bridges completed in 2019
Double-decker bridges